UNW may refer to:

University of Northwestern – St. Paul
Union of Northern Workers
UN-Water